Otto Neumüller (born 9 November 1908; date of death unknown) was an Austrian sprint canoeist who competed in the late 1930s. He won a gold medal in the C-1 1000 m event at the 1938 ICF Canoe Sprint World Championships in Vaxholm, Sweden.

Neumüller also competed at the 1936 Summer Olympics in Berlin, finishing fourth in the C-1 1000 m event.

References

Otto Neumüller's profile at Sports Reference.com

1908 births
Year of death missing
Austrian male canoeists
Canoeists at the 1936 Summer Olympics
Olympic canoeists of Austria
ICF Canoe Sprint World Championships medalists in Canadian